Edward Melaika (born June 17, 1931) is an American sailor. He competed in the Finn event at the 1952 Summer Olympics.

References

External links
 

1931 births
Living people
American male sailors (sport)
Olympic sailors of the United States
Sailors at the 1952 Summer Olympics – Finn
Place of birth missing (living people)